Douai is a railway station serving the town of Douai, Nord, France. The station opened in 1846 and is located on the Paris–Lille railway and Douai–Valenciennes railway. The train services are operated by SNCF.

Train services
The station is served by the following services:

High speed services (TGV) Valenciennes - Douai - Arras - Paris
High speed services (TGV) Lille - Aeroport CDG - Lyon - Avignon - Marseille
High speed services (TGV) Lille - Aeroport CDG - Le Mans - Rennes / Angers - Nantes
High speed services (TGV) Lille - Aeroport CDG - St-Pierre-des-Corps - Bordeaux
Regional services (TER Hauts-de-France) Lille - Douai - Arras - Paris
Regional services (TER Hauts-de-France) Lille - Douai - Cambrai - St-Quentin
Regional services (TER Hauts-de-France) Lille - Douai - Valenciennes

References

External links
Douai Station

Railway stations in Nord (French department)
Buildings and structures in Douai
Railway stations in France opened in 1846